Through a Frosty Plate Glass E.P. is an EP by the indie rock band Grandaddy. It was released in 2001 on V2 Records. All of the songs had previously appeared as B-sides to the band's European singles.

Release 

Through a Frosty Plate Glass E.P. was released in 2001.

It was later included in some two-disc editions of The Sophtware Slump.

Reception 

Through a Frosty Plate Glass E.P. reached number 21 in the "Top 75" of CMJ New Music Monthly's August 2001 edition. Upon the 2011 release of the deluxe edition of The Sophtware Slump, BBC Music reviewer Mike Diver notes that "fans will be pleased to get their ears around material" from Through a Frosty Plate Glass E.P..

Track listing

Personnel 

 Jason Lytle – performer, production
 Gary Young – recording (track 7)

References

External links 

 

Grandaddy albums
2001 EPs